Lou Romano (born April 15, 1972) is an American animator and voice actor. He did design work on Monsters, Inc. and The Incredibles, and he provided the voices of Bernie Kropp in The Incredibles, Snot Rod in Cars and Alfredo Linguini in Ratatouille.

Romano had an interest in drawing and painting at an early age and studied theater arts, performing in plays throughout junior high and high school. He studied acting at the San Diego School of Creative and Performing Arts (SCPA). After graduating in 1990 he studied animation at the California Institute of the Arts. He then completed workshops at The Groundlings in Los Angeles. He later went on to work as an art director and designer for animated projects, such as The Powerpuff Girls and The Iron Giant.

In 2000, Romano joined Pixar as the production designer of The Incredibles, for which he won an Annie Award in 2005. His artwork has been exhibited at the Museum of Modern Art and the Gallery at The Metropolitan Opera in New York City and has been published on the cover of The New Yorker. In 2009, Romano left Pixar to work at Laika in Portland, Oregon. Lou and his wife reside in the Bay Area.

Filmography 
Wendell & Wild (2022) – Production Designer
Luca (2021) – Development Artist
Wonder Park (2019) – Art Director
The Lego Movie 2: The Second Part (2019) – Visual Development Artist
Dumbo (2019) – Concept Artist
Samurai Jack (2017) – Layout Keys
Kubo and the Two Strings (2016) – Concept Artist
The Little Prince (2016) – Production Designer
The Boxtrolls (2014) – Additional Character Designer
Paperman (2012) – Visual Development Artist
ParaNorman (2012) – Thanks
Kinect Rush: A Disney-Pixar Adventure (2012) – voice of Alfredo Linguini
Up (2009) – Art Director: Lighting
Your Friend the Rat (2007) – voice of Alfredo Linguini
Ratatouille (2007) – Alfredo Linguini
Wilbur (2007–2008) – Ramoni, Ray (singing)
Cars (2006) – voice of Snot Rod
Jack-Jack Attack (2005) – Art Director: Lighting
The Incredibles (2004) – Bernie Kropp Production Designer
Boys Night Out (2003) – Voice
Monkeybone (2001) – Cop/Psycharist
Monsters, Inc. (2001) – Visual Development
The Trouble with Lou (2001) – Lou/Ciro Romano
Herd (1999) – Bible Boy #1
The Iron Giant (1999) – Visual Development
The Powerpuff Girls (1998) – Background Color Designer, Storyboard Artist
Cats Don't Dance (1997) – Effects Assistant
Dexter's Laboratory (1996) – Storyboard Artist
The Pagemaster (1994) – Effects Assistant
Whoopass Stew! (1992) – Amoeba Boys

References

External links 

 Lou Romano's blog
 

1972 births
Living people
American animators
American art directors
American male voice actors
American production designers
American storyboard artists
Annie Award winners
Artists from San Diego
California Institute of the Arts alumni
Male actors from San Diego
Laika (company) people
Pixar people